The following is a list of notable alumni of the Harvard Extension School.

Business
Rory Cowan, ABE ’79 - CEO,  Lionbridge Technologies Inc
Robert Maginn, ALM ’81 - CEO and Chairman of the Board of Directors, Jenzabar Inc.
Sal Perisano, ALM ’87 - CEO and Chairman, iParty
Ekaterina Rybolovleva -  Owner of football club AS Monaco FC
Oreoluwa Lesi - Founder and executive director of Women's Technology Empowerment Centre
Armando Gutierrez 
Ria Cheruvu, ALB '18, ALM '20 - AI Deep Learning Researcher at Intel Corporation

Arts and media
Jenny Allard, ALM '99 - sportswoman
Allan Crite, ABE '68 - artist
Robelyn Garcia, GC '20 - sportswoman, writer, author, and Arizona State University faculty
Christine Leunens, ALM '05 - novelist
Luis Carlos Velez, CSS ’99 - anchor reporter CNN, Caracol 
Danny Yamashiro, ALM '17 - media talk show host and author
Rosy Lamb - sculptor, painter and author
Tahnee Ahtoneharjo - artist, regalia maker, curator

Film, theater, and television
Ryan Slattery, ALB ’09 - film and television actor, writer, producer
Diane Neal, AA '18 - American actress and U.S. Congressional Candidate

Academia
Latanya Sweeney, ALB ’95 - Professor of Government and Technology in Residence at Harvard University, Faculty Dean in Currier House at Harvard 
A. Breeze Harper ALM '07 - critical race feminist, diversity strategist, and author
Paul Reid, ALB ’90 - writer and biographer
Nemat Sadat, ALM '10 - LGBTI rights activist, former professor of political science at American University of Afghanistan
Danny Yamashiro, ALM '17 - Chaplain at Massachusetts Institute of Technology (MIT) and researcher on American presidents and childhood trauma.

Government
Chester A. Dolan Jr. - President of the Massachusetts Senate (1949) and Member of the Massachusetts House of Representatives
Francisco Santos Calderón, CSS - Vice President, Republic of Colombia
Bradley Jones Jr, AA ’87, ALB ’88 - Massachusetts House Minority Leader
Bruce Ayers - 1st Norfolk District in the Massachusetts House of Representatives
Joseph R. Paolino, Jr., ALM '89 - Ambassador to Malta
Mauricio Escanero, ALM - Ambassador and Head of the Mission of Mexico to the European Union
Ann Romney - wife of 2012 Republican U.S. presidential nominee Mitt Romney
Scott Taylor ALB '14 - U.S. Representative for Virginia's 2nd congressional district
Álvaro Uribe, CSS ’93 - 56th President of Colombia
Brian Mast, ALB '16 - U.S. Representative for Florida's 18th congressional district
Chris Wakim - former member of the West Virginia House of Delegates
Gerald Oriol Jr., ALM - Haiti’s Secretary of State for the Integration of Persons with Disabilities
Maliz E. Beams, CSS - Counselor of the United States Department of State
Jamus Lim, ALM - Member of the Singapore Parliament

Non-profits
Mark Plotkin, ALB ’79 - ethnobotanist; President, Amazon Conservation Team 
 Evan R. Bernstein, Community Activist / CEO and National Director of The Community Security Service

Journalism
Chanel Rion, ALB '15 -  White House correspondent for One America News Network

Marcela García, '05 - associate editor and columnist for the Boston Globe

Law
Sarah Buel, ALB '87 - attorney

Writers
A. Breeze Harper, ALM '07 - author of books and studies on veganism and racism
Harold L. Humes, Adjunct in Arts

Others
James Hogue
Russ Hogue, PhD, ALM ’21 - Professional boxer, kickboxer; US Kickboxing Champion

References

Harvard Extension School